Robert Sylvester Kelly (born January 8, 1967), better known as R. Kelly, is an American musician and convicted racketeer and sex offender.

Kelly enjoyed commercial success over his recording career and sold over 75 million records worldwide. He won three Grammys for his song "I Believe I Can Fly", and was also nominated for his song "You Are Not Alone" recorded by Michael Jackson. Critics dubbed him "the King of R&B" while he billed himself the "Pied Piper of R&B".

Investigations by law enforcement and journalists revealed that Kelly used his fame to seek out underage fans for sexual gratification. Exposure of video recordings of these encounters led the Cook County State's Attorney to prosecute him for child pornography. In spite of the video evidence, Kelly won acquittal in 2008. Testifying years later, a victim depicted in the video testified to Kelly using bribes and threats to stop her and her family from pressing charges. Kelly's lawyer Ed Genson told the Chicago Sun-Times Kelly was "guilty as hell." 

The 2019 documentary television series Surviving R. Kelly reexamined accusations of Kelly's sexual misconduct with minors. Backlash led RCA Records to terminate their contract with Kelly. Law enforcement pursued new criminal cases in multiple jurisdictions, resulting in Kelly's arrest on July 2019.  A 2021 trial in Brooklyn federal court convicted Kelly for violations of the Mann Act and racketeering. A 2022 trial in Chicago federal court convicted Kelly for three child pornography charges and three charges of enticing a minor. Kelly was sentenced to serve 31 years imprisonment in a combination of concurrent and consecutive sentences. 

, Kelly is an inmate of Metropolitan Correctional Center, Chicago. He continues to challenge his two convictions.

Early life
Robert Sylvester Kelly was born on the South Side of Chicago, Illinois, on January 8, 1967 at Chicago Lying-In Hospital (now University of Chicago Medical Center) in the city's Hyde Park neighborhood. He has five siblings (three of which are half), two older sisters and brother, along with a younger brother and sister. His mother, Joanne, was a schoolteacher and devout Baptist. She was born in Arkansas. The identity of his father, who was absent from Kelly's life and later raised two children, is not known. His family lived in the Ida B. Wells Homes public housing project in the Black Metropolis–Bronzeville District of Chicago's Douglas neighborhood, also on the city's south side. Around the time he was five years old, Kelly's mother married his stepfather, Lucious, who reportedly worked for an airline. Kelly began singing in the church choir at age eight.

Trauma and abuse 
Kelly described having a girlfriend, Lulu, at age eight, in his autobiography. He stated that their last play date turned tragic when, after fighting with older children over a play area by a creek, she was pushed into the water, swept downstream by a fast-moving current, and drowned. Kelly called Lulu his first musical inspiration.

Kelly said members of his household would act differently when his mother and grandparents were not home. From age 8 to 14, he was sexually abused by an older female family member. Kelly's younger brother, Carey, stated that he suffered from years of sexual abuse at the hands of his older sister, Theresa, who was entrusted with babysitting her siblings. Carey stated that although their older brother, Bruce, was spared and allowed to play outside, both he and Kelly were punished at separate times indoors by Theresa, who refused to acknowledge the abuse when confronted years later.

Explaining why he never told anyone, Kelly wrote in his 2012 autobiography, Soulacoaster: The Diary of Me, that he was "too afraid and too ashamed". Around age 10, Kelly was also sexually abused by an older male who was a friend of the family. In his autobiography, Kelly described being shot in the shoulder, at age 11, by boys who were attempting to steal his bike, although a family friend later stated that Kelly had shot himself while attempting suicide.

Turn toward music 
In September 1980, Kelly entered Kenwood Academy in the city's Hyde Park-Kenwood district, where he met music teacher Lena McLin, who encouraged Kelly to perform the Stevie Wonder classic "Ribbon in the Sky" in the high school talent show. A shy Kelly put on sunglasses, was escorted onto the stage, sang the song and won first prize. McLin encouraged Kelly to leave the high school basketball team and concentrate on music. She said he was furious at first, but after his performance in the talent show, he changed his mind. Kelly was diagnosed with dyslexia, which left him unable to read or write. Kelly dropped out of high school after attending Kenwood Academy for one year. He began performing in the subway under the Chicago "L" tracks. He regularly busked at the "L" stop on the Red Line's Jackson station in the Loop.

In his youth, Kelly played basketball with Illinois state champion basketball player Ben Wilson and later sang "It's So Hard to Say Goodbye to Yesterday" at Wilson's funeral.

Musical career

During his recording career, Kelly sold over 75 million records worldwide, making him the most commercially successful male R&B artist of the 1990s and one of the world's best-selling music artists. He won three Grammys for his song "I Believe I Can Fly", and was also nominated for his song "You Are Not Alone" recorded by Michael Jackson. Critics dubbed him "the King of R&B" while he billed himself the "Pied Piper of R&B".

1989–1996: Born into the 90's, 12 Play and R. Kelly

MGM (Musically Gifted Men or Mentally Gifted Men) was formed in 1989 with Robert Kelly, Marc McWilliams, Vincent Walker and Shawn Brooks. In 1990, MGM were offered a contract with an independent label, Tavdash Records. Shortly after, they recorded and released one single, "Why You Wanna Play Me." Kelly gained national recognition when MGM participated on the talent TV show Big Break, hosted by Natalie Cole. MGM performed "All My Love", which would become a demo for Kelly's song "She's Got That Vibe." The group went on to win the $100,000 grand prize in 1991 before they disbanded.  

In 1991, Kelly signed with Jive Records. Kelly's debut album, Born into the 90's, was released in early 1992 (credited as R. Kelly and Public Announcement). The album, released during the new jack swing period of the early 1990s, yielded the R&B hits "She's Got That Vibe", "Honey Love", "Dedicated", and "Slow Dance (Hey Mr. DJ)", with Kelly singing lead vocals. During late 1992, Kelly and Public Announcement embarked on a tour entitled "60653" after the zip code of their Chicago neighborhood. This would be the only album co-credited with Public Announcement. Kelly separated from the group in 1993.

Kelly's first solo album, 12 Play, was released on November 9, 1993, and yielded the singer's first number-one hit, "Bump N' Grind", which spent a record-breaking 12 weeks at number one on the Billboard Hot R&B Singles chart. Subsequent hit singles: "Your Body's Callin'" (U.S. Hot 100: #13, U.S. R&B: #2) and "Sex Me" (U.S. Hot 100: #20, U.S. R&B: #8). Both singles sold 500,000 copies in the United States and were certified Gold by the RIAA. In 1994, 12 Play was certified Gold by the RIAA, eventually going six times platinum.

In 1994, Kelly established himself as a leading producer by producing songs for various artists, including Aaliyah, Janet Jackson and Changing Faces. He co-headlined a tour with Salt-N-Pepa and headlined the Budweiser Superfest tour.

1995–1996 R. Kelly and "I Believe I Can Fly" 

In 1995, Kelly garnered his first Grammy nominations; two for writing, producing, and composing Michael Jackson's last number-one hit, "You Are Not Alone".

Kelly's success continued with the November 14, 1995, release of R. Kelly, his eponymous second studio album. Critics praised him for his departure from salacious bedroom songs to embracing vulnerability. New York Times contributor Stephen Holden described Kelly as "The reigning king of pop-soul sex talks a lot tougher than Barry White, the father of such fluffed-up pillow talks and along with Marvin Gaye and Donny Hathaway, [both] major influences for Kelly." In December 1995, Professor Michael Eric Dyson critiqued Kelly's self-titled album "R. Kelly" for VIBE. Dyson described Kelly's growth from the 12 Play album: "Kelly reshapes his personal turmoil to artistic benefit" and noted that Kelly is "reborn before our very own ears".

The album reached number one on the Billboard 200 chart, becoming Kelly's first number one album on the chart, and reached number one on the R&B album charts; his second. The R. Kelly album spawned three platinum hit singles: "You Remind Me of Something" (U.S. Hot 100: #4, U.S. R&B: #1), "I Can't Sleep Baby (If I)" (U.S. Hot 100: #5, U.S. R&B: #1), and "Down Low (Nobody Has To Know)" (U.S. Hot 100: #4, U.S. R&B: #1); a duet with Ronald Isley. Kelly's self-titled album sold four million copies, receiving 4× platinum certification from the RIAA. He promoted the album with a 50-city "Down Low Top Secret Tour" with LL Cool J, Xscape, and Solo.

On November 26, 1996, Kelly released "I Believe I Can Fly", an inspirational song originally released on the soundtrack for the film Space Jam. "I Believe I Can Fly" reached No. 2 on the Billboard Hot 100, and No. 1 on the UK charts for three weeks and won three Grammy Awards in 1998. In that same year, he contributed to "Freak Tonight" for the A Thin Line Between Love and Hate soundtrack.

1997–2001: Basketball, R., TP-2.COM, and Rockland Records

In 1997, Kelly signed a contract to play professional basketball with the Atlantic City Seagulls of the USBL. He wore the number 12 in honor of his album 12 Play. Kelly said "I love basketball enough to not totally let go of my music, but just put it to the side for a minute and fulfill some dreams of mine that I've had for a long time." Kelly's USBL contract contained a clause that would allow him to fulfill a music obligation when necessary. "If Whitney Houston needs a song written", said Ken Gross, the Seagulls owner who signed Kelly, "he would be able to leave the team to do that and come back". "It wasn't a gimmick", Gross continued, "he's a ballplayer. He can play."

In the same year, Kelly collaborated with American rapper The Notorious B.I.G. for the song "Fuck You Tonight" on the posthumous album Life After Death.

In 1998, he launched his own label, Rockland Records, in a distribution deal with Jimmy Iovine's Interscope Records. The label's roster included artists Sparkle, Boo & Gotti, Talent, Vegas Cats, Lady, Frankie, Secret Weapon, and Rebecca F. That May, Sparkle, Rockland's first signed artist, released her eponymous debut album. In addition to producing and writing the project, Kelly made vocal contribution to the hit duet "Be Careful", which became a serious factor as to why the album was certified platinum in December 2000.

On November 17, 1998, Kelly released his fourth studio and first double album, R. Musically, the album spans different genres from pop (Celine Dion), street rap (Nas and Jay-Z) to Blues ("Suicide"). Dave Hoekstra of the Los Angeles Times described the album as "easily the most ambitious project of his career". In the summer of 1999, he wrote and produced a majority of the soundtrack to the Martin Lawrence and Eddie Murphy film, Life, which features tracks from K-Ci & JoJo, Maxwell, Mýa, and Destiny's Child, among others. The soundtrack was also released on the Rockland imprint.

In early 2000, Kelly received multiple awards reflecting his status as an established R&B superstar. In January 2000, he won Favorite Male Soul/R&B Artist at the American Music Awards and, in February, was nominated for several Grammy Awards, including Best Male R&B Vocal Performance ("When a Woman's Fed Up"), Best R&B Album (R.), and Best Rap Performance by a Duo or Group ("Satisfy You") with P. Diddy.

On November 7, 2000, he released his fifth studio album, TP-2.com, a project aligned with his breakthrough album, 12 Play. Unlike R., all songs on TP-2.com were written, arranged, and produced by Kelly. AllMusic's Jason Birchmeier gave TP-2.com 4 stars and stated: "Kelly knows how to take proven formulas and funnel them through his own stylistic aesthetic, which usually means slowing down the tempo, laying on lush choruses of strings and background vocals, taming down the lyrics for radio, and catering his pitch primarily to wistful women.

In 2001, Kelly won the Outstanding Achievement Award at the Music of Black Origin or MOBO Awards and Billboard magazine ranked TP-2.com number 94 on the magazine's Top 200 Albums of the Decade. Kelly's song, "The World's Greatest", from the soundtrack to the 2001 autobiographical film, Ali, was a hit.

2002–2003: The Best of Both Worlds and Chocolate Factory

On January 24, 2002, at a press conference announcing the completion of Kelly and Jay-Z's first collaborative album, The Best of Both Worlds, celebrities such as Johnnie Cochran, Russell Simmons, Luther Vandross, and Sean Combs praised the album, with Jay-Z stating that he hoped the collaboration represents "more unity for black people on a whole". MTV's Shaheem Reid wrote: "And if Jay and Kelly can put their egos to the side long enough to wrap up and promote their album, then their labels—Def Jam and Jive, respectively—can surely figure out a way to join forces and make cheddar together."

On February 8, 2002, Kelly performed at the closing ceremony of the 2002 Winter Olympics at the same time a news scandal broke of a sex tape that appeared to show Kelly with an underage girl.

When the joint album leaked on February 22, 2002, it caused Jay-Z and Damon Dash's label, Def Jam-distributed Roc-A-Fella, and Jive to modify the album's release date in March. Jay-Z expressed frustration about the album leak to MTV News: "It's the gift and the curse. It's an honor that everybody wants your music fast, but on the other hand, it's another thing when the music gets out before you [want it to]. Because that's your art. You feel attached to it. You feel a certain way and you want people to go out and support it. The time that you take, it's like a piece of your life. You take parts of your life and you put it on these records and then for it to just be traded and moved around [is frustrating]. Upon release on March 19, 2002, The Best of Both Worlds sold 285,000 copies in its opening week and debuted at number two on the Billboard 200. It was a critical and commercial disappointment.

In May 2002, Kelly's initial sixth studio album, Loveland, leaked and was delayed for releasing in November. Kelly restructured the album which was later packaged as a deluxe edition bonus disc of the now-renamed Chocolate Factory. In October of that year, Kelly released the remix to its single, "Ignition". It charted at number two on the Billboard Hot 100.

On February 18, 2003, Kelly released the album, Chocolate Factory. It debuted at number one on the Billboard 200, ending the first two-week run of rapper 50 Cent's Get Rich or Die Tryin'. It sold 532,000 copies in its first week. The album was also supported by its follow-up singles, "Snake" and the remix of "Step in the Name of Love"; the latter of which peaked at number nine on the Hot 100. Later that year, in September, Kelly's first greatest hits album, The R. in R&B Collection, Vol. 1, was released which included "Thoia Thoing" and two other previously unreleased songs.

2004–2005: Unfinished Business, Happy People/U Saved Me and TP.3 Reloaded

Between mid-2003 and early 2004, Kelly began work on a double CD album, one with "happy" tracks and another with "inspirational" tracks. The double album, Happy People/U Saved Me, was released on August 24, 2004. It debuted at number two on the Billboard 200, with first week sales of 264,000 copies. Both of the album's titled tracks respectively performed underwhelmingly; "Happy People" charted at number twenty-nine on the Adult R&B song chart while "U Saved Me" peaked at number fifty-two on the Billboard Hot 100.

Two months later, Kelly and Jay-Z reunited to release their second collaborative album, Unfinished Business. The album received criticism and, as with the pair's previous collaboration, it was also a commercial failure, despite debuting at number one on the Billboard 200. Album promotion and its Best of Both Worlds tour were both plagued by tension between the stars, with Kelly reportedly showing up late or not at all to gigs. Kelly complained that the touring lights were not directed towards him and allegedly assaulted the tour's lighting director.

Jay-Z eventually removed Kelly halfway through the tour, after a member of Jay-Z's entourage pepper sprayed Kelly on October 29, 2004. Tyran "Ty Ty" Smith was charged with assault, but took a plea deal for disorderly conduct. Kelly bounced back commercially after appearing on Ja Rule's single, "Wonderful" alongside Ashanti. The song charted at number five on the Billboard Hot 100, topped the UK Singles Chart and went platinum in the summer of 2005.

After finishing Happy People/U Saved Me and Unfinished Business in 2004, Kelly released TP.3 Reloaded in July 2005. It became Kelly's fifth consecutive number-one album in his career. TP.3 Reloaded was heavily cross-promoted by the first five chapters of Kelly's musical serial, Trapped in the Closet.

2006–2009: Double Up and Untitled, Africa 

In December 2006, Kelly built momentum for his eighth solo studio album, Double Up, after guest-appearing on Bow Wow's "I'm a Flirt". Three months later, Kelly's remix of "I'm a Flirt" was released, but instead of Bow Wow, it featured T.I. and T-Pain. On May 29, 2007, the album was released. It became Kelly's sixth and final album in his career to chart at number one on the Billboard 200. Kelly's other singles from Double Up titled "Same Girl" was a duet of Kelly and Usher, while "Rise Up" was a tribute to the victims of the Virginia Tech shooting that occurred earlier that year in April, a month before the album was released. The song was previously released as a digital download on May 15, 2007. Proceeds were donated to the Hokie Spirit Memorial Fund to help family members of the victims of the shootings.

Kelly began his Double Up tour with Ne-Yo, Keyshia Cole and J. Holiday opening for him. One week into the tour, promoter Leonard Rowe had Ne-Yo removed from the tour because of a contract dispute. However, Ne-Yo alleges that the reason for the dropout was because Ne-Yo believes he received a better response from critics and fans. Ne-Yo won a lawsuit that he filed against Rowe Entertainment in 2008. Kelly was not mentioned in the lawsuit. In December 2007, Kelly failed to appear at another preliminary court hearing on his case due to his tour bus being held up in Utah. The judge threatened to revoke Kelly's bond, but eventually decided against it. In 2008, Kelly released a rap track titled "I'm a Beast" in which he coarsely attacked his detractors, yet did not name the subjects of the song.

In 2008, before and after being acquitted on charges of producing child sexual abuse material, Billboard reported that Kelly had plans to release his newest album titled 12 Play: Fourth Quarter in the summer of that year but the album was postponed. Billboard named Kelly among the most successful artists ever for its 50th Anniversary List. In the spring, the promotional single "Hair Braider", peaked at No. 56 on Billboard's R&B chart. On July 28, the entire album leaked online, causing the title to be scrapped.

In February 2009, Kelly announced that he was working on a new album called Untitled with a projected release date of September 29, but it had been delayed to December. In June 2009, he released his first mixtape, The "Demo" Tape, presented by DJ Skee and DJ Drama.

Kelly headlined the Arise African Fashion Awards in Johannesburg, South Africa, on June 20, 2009. He performed in Cape Town, followed by Nigeria as part of the annual ThisDay music and fashion festival in July. That same month, he released "Number One", featuring singer-songwriter Keri Hilson. Then, on December 1, Kelly's untitled ninth solo album was released. It charted on the Billboard 200 at number four. More singles from the album include "Echo", "Supaman High" and "Be My #2". In January 2010, Kelly performed in Kampala, Uganda. "I'm very excited about my first visit to Africa, I've dreamed about this for a long time and it's finally here", Kelly said in a statement. "It will be one of the highlights of not only my career but my life. I can't wait to perform in front of my fans in Africa—who have been some of the best in the world."

2010–2012: Epic, Love Letter, throat surgery, and Write Me Back

Kelly performed at the 2010 FIFA World Cup opening ceremony on June 11, 2010. In an interview in the September 2010 issue of XXL magazine, Kelly said he was working on three new albums (Epic, Love Letter, and Zodiac) which he described as "remixing himself". Epic, a compilation filled with powerful ballads including "The World's Greatest" and "Sign of a Victory", only saw a European release on September 21, 2010. However, it is also available for streaming worldwide.

In November 2010, Kelly collaborated with several African musicians forming a supergroup known as One8. The group featured 2Face from Nigeria, Ali Kiba from Tanzania, Congolese singer Fally Ipupa, 4X4 from Ghana, hip-hop artist Movaizhaleine from Gabon, Zambia's JK, Ugandan hip-hop star Navio and Kenya's Amani, the only female in the group. The first release from the group was "Hands Across the World" written and produced by Kelly.

Kelly's tenth album Love Letter, released on December 14, 2010, included 15 songs, one of which was Kelly singing "You Are Not Alone", a track Kelly originally wrote for Michael Jackson. The first single "When a Woman Loves" was nominated for a Grammy for Best Traditional R&B Vocal Performance at the 53rd Annual Grammy Awards.

At the 2011 Pre-Grammy Gala in Los Angeles, Kelly performed a medley of hits and in March 2011, Kelly was named the No. 1 R&B artist of the last 25 years by Billboard.

On July 19, 2011, Kelly was admitted to the Northwestern Memorial Hospital in Chicago to undergo emergency throat surgery to drain an abscess on one of his tonsils, and was released on July 21, 2011. He cancelled his performance at the Reggae Sumfest in Jamaica that was scheduled for the following Friday. Johnny Gourzong, Sumfest Productions executive director, commented, "We are truly going to miss his presence on the festival." On September 23, 2011, Variety confirmed that Kelly had signed on to write original music for the Sparkle soundtrack.

In 2011, Kelly worked with writer David Ritz on an autobiography entitled Soulacoaster: The Diary of Me, which was later released in the summer of 2012.

On October 7, 2011, after Sony's RCA Music Group announced the consolidation of Jive, Arista and J Records into RCA Records, Kelly was set to release music under the RCA brand.

Following his throat surgery, Kelly released "Shut Up" to generally favorable reviews: Spin magazine said, "Kelly taking aim at the haters who said "he's washed up, he's lost it." He hasn't. Dude's voice is in prime smooth R&B form". On December 21, 2011, Kelly made a live appearance on The X Factor and gave his first performance after the surgery. Kelly revealed to Rolling Stone that he felt like he was "just starting out" and how the performance was a "wake up call" for him.

In 2012, Kelly made a series of announcements including a follow-up to the Love Letter album titled Write Me Back, which was released on June 26 to little fanfare, as well as a third installment of Trapped in the Closet and The Single Ladies Tour featuring R&B singer, Tamia. In February 2012, Kelly performed "I Look to You", a song he wrote for Whitney Houston, at Houston's homegoing.

2013–2017: Black Panties, The Buffet, and 12 Nights of Christmas

During 2013, Kelly continued his "The Single Ladies Tour". He performed at music festivals across North America, including Bonnaroo, Pitchfork, and Macy's Music Festival. On June 30, 2013, R. Kelly performed live at BET Awards Show singing hits as well as his new track "My Story" featuring Atlanta rapper 2 Chainz. The song was the lead single for Kelly's twelfth studio album Black Panties. released on December 10, 2013. Writing for New York magazine, David Marchese stated that Black Panties "was like a dare to the world: After all that he'd been accused of, after avoiding conviction, could R. Kelly still get away with making sex-obsessed music?"

In 2013, Kelly collaborated with several artists including Celine Dion, Mariah Carey, Mary J. Blige, and Jennifer Hudson. In an interview with Global Grind in November, he described follow up work with Celine Dion after their number one single "I'm Your Angel" from 1998. Kelly worked with singer Mariah Carey for her album "The Art of Letting Go".

Kelly co-wrote and sang on Lady Gaga's song "Do What U Want" from her 2013 album Artpop, performing the duet with her on Saturday Night Live on November 16, 2013, and at the 2013 American Music Awards. "Do What U Want" had since been removed from streaming services and re-releases of Gaga's Artpop album following sexual misconduct allegations against Kelly in early 2019. He also collaborated with Birdman and Lil Wayne on "We Been On", a single from the Cash Money Records compilation, Rich Gang. He also appeared on Twista's first single on his new album "Dark Horse". On November 17, 2013, Kelly and Justin Bieber debuted a collaboration entitled "PYD".

Kelly was featured on the soundtrack album of the film The Best Man Holiday with his song "Christmas, I'll Be Steppin'".

Kelly stated his intention to tour with R&B singer Mary J. Blige on "The King & Queen Tour" prior to the Black Panties Tour while continuing to create segments of the hip hopera Trapped in the Closet.

In July 2014, Kelly announced that he was working on a house music album.

In November 2015, Kelly released "Switch Up" featuring fellow Chicagoan Jeremih and Lil Wayne, followed by "Wake Up Everybody", "Marching Band" and "Backyard Party". The following month, the album containing those singles, The Buffet, was released. It charted poorly on the Billboard 200 at number sixteen with first-week sales of 39,000 album-equivalent copies.

The following year, after a two-and-a-half-year delay, Kelly presented his only Christmas album, also his fourteenth and final studio album in his career thus far, 12 Nights of Christmas, which was released on October 21, 2016.

2018–2022: "I Admit" 

Kelly released the 19-minute-long "I Admit" on SoundCloud on July 23, 2018, as a response to his accusers. The song does not contain any criminal admissions despite its title and chorus, which repeats the lyric "I admit it, I did it". In "I Admit", Kelly denies allegations of domestic violence and pedophilia, asserting that they are matters of opinion. Kelly also denounces Jim DeRogatis and repudiates his investigative report's claim of Kelly operating a "sex cult". Addressing the Mute R. Kelly social media campaign, Kelly sings, "only God can mute me".

The song was criticized by reviewers, who described it as an act of trolling. Many outlets compared the song to that of his "Heaven I Need a Hug" extended version, Trapped in the Closet opera, "I Believe I Can Fly" concert remix, and O. J. Simpson's autobiographical novel If I Did It. Andrea Kelly and Carey Killa Kelly (R. Kelly's ex-wife and brother, respectively) responded to "I Admit" with songs that contain additional allegations against R. Kelly.

An album credited to Kelly titled I Admit It after and including the 19-minute song from 2018 was released on streaming services on December 9, 2022, but was taken down after it was not approved by Sony or R. Kelly's team. The album was credited to Sony's Legacy Recordings but actually uploaded by Real Talk Entertainment, who had released the album through a sub-label also named Legacy Recordings. This resulted in the credited distributor, Universal Music Group-owned Ingrooves, cutting ties with Real Talk Entertainment.

Touring career 
Kelly toured extensively as a live musician. His concert tours included:
60653 Tour (w/ Public Announcement) (1993)
The 12 Play Very Necessary Tour (with Salt-N-Pepa) (1994)
The Down Low Top Secret Tour (with LL Cool J, Xscape, and Solo) (1996)
The Get Up on a Room Tour (with Kelly Price, Nas, Foxy Brown, and Deborah Cox) (1999)
The TP-2.com Tour (with Sunshine Anderson & Syleena Johnson) (2001)
The Key in the Ignition Tour (with Ashanti) (2003)
The Best Of Both Worlds Tour (w/ Jay-Z) (2004)
The Light It Up Tour (2006)
The Double Up Tour (with J. Holiday & Keyshia Cole) (2007)
The Ladies Make Some Noise Tour (with K. Michelle) (2009)
Love Letter Tour (with Keyshia Cole & Marsha Ambrosius) (2011)
The Single Ladies Tour (with Tamia) (2012–13)
Black Panties Tour (2014–16)
The Buffet Tour (2016)

Artistry

Musical style and influences 
Kelly's music took root in R&B, hip hop and soul. He was influenced by listening to his mother, Joanne Kelly, sing. She played records by Donny Hathaway and Marvin Gaye, inspirations for Kelly.  In reference to Hathaway, Kelly stated: "A guy like Donny Hathaway had a focused, sexual texture in his voice that I always wanted in mine. He had smooth, soulful tones, but he was spiritual at the same time. In his autobiography, Kelly stated that he was heavily influenced by Marvin Gaye's R&B Lothario image. "I had to make a 'baby-makin' album. If Marvin Gaye did it, I wanted to do it", Kelly said.

While Kelly created a smooth, professional mixture of hip-hop beats, soulman crooning and funk, the most distinctive element of his music is its explicit sensuality. "Sex Me", "Bump n' Grind", "Your Body's Callin'", and "Feelin' on Yo Booty" are considered to be examples, as their productions were seductive enough to sell such blatant come-ons. Kelly's crossover appeal was also sustained by his development of a flair for pop balladry.

Vocal style and lyrical themes 
Writing for the New York Daily News in 1997, Nunyo Demasio stated "With a voice that easily shifts from booming baritone to seductive alto, Kelly has gained international celebrity by combining streetwise rhythms with sexually explicit lyrics." Love and sex are the topics of the majority of Kelly's lyrical content, although he has written about a wide variety of themes such as inspiration and spirituality. Chicago Sun-Times reporters Jim DeRogatis and Abdon Pallasch observed about the contrasting themes: "... the image he liked to project was that of the "R&B Thug"... bringing the streetwise persona of the gangsta rapper into the more polite world of R&B."

Kelly expressed that he writes from everyday experiences and prides himself on being versatile. Larry Khan, senior vice president of Jive's urban marketing and promotion, said that Kelly's musical compass is second to none. DeRogatis and Pallasch reported that at concerts where Kelly would go from singing "Like a Real Freak" to "I Wish": "Many fans found these abrupt shifts between the transcendent and the venal, the inspirational and the X-rated jarring."

Influence 
Kelly is considered to be one of the most successful R&B artists since the mid-1980s. He is also one of the best-selling music artists in the United States, with over 30 million albums sold, as well as only the fifth black artist to enter the top 50 of the same list. Rolling Stone magazine called him "arguably the most important R&B figure of the 1990s and 2000s". Music executive Barry Weiss described Kelly as "the modern-day Prince, although there's a bit of Marvin Gaye in him, and a bit of Irving Berlin".

In addition to his solo and collaboration success, Kelly has also written and produced several hit songs, such as "Fortunate" for Maxwell, "You Are Not Alone" for Michael Jackson, "G.H.E.T.T.O.U.T." for Changing Faces, "Bump, Bump, Bump" for B2K, and many more. R. Kelly has been compared to artists like Sam Cooke and Marvin Gaye.

Honors and awards 

Kelly has received and been nominated for multiple awards, as a songwriter, producer, and singer. He won three Grammy Awards for his song "I Believe I Can Fly": Best Male R&B Vocal Performance, Best Rhythm and Blues Song, and Best Song Written Specifically for a Motion Picture or for Television. After Kelly's federal conviction in New York, The Recording Academy received major backlash in 2021 for refusing to strip Kelly of his awards.

Kelly was given a key to the city of Baton Rouge, Louisiana, in 2013 as "an artist whose music brings generations together". On September 30, 2021, following his New York conviction of multiple sex crimes, the key was rescinded.

Abuse scandals and court cases
Kelly has repeatedly faced allegations of sexual abuse that have resulted in multiple civil suits and criminal trials, activities culminating in a 2021 conviction for violations of the Mann Act and Racketeer Influenced and Corrupt Organizations Act. Defenders of Kelly maintain that he is merely a "playboy" and a "sex symbol."  Judge Ann Donnelly, who presided over Kelly's 2021 trial, summarized Kelly's actions as having "[used] his fame and organization to lure young people into abusive sexual relationships—a racketeering enterprise that the government alleged spanned about 25 years."

Early sexual abuse accusations (1990s–2000s)

First reports 
In December 2000, the Chicago Sun-Times first reported that police had made two investigations that Kelly was having sex with an underage female but had to drop the investigations due to lack of cooperation by the girls accusing him. A civil suit filed in 1996 by Tiffany Hawkins detailed allegations that, starting in 1991 when she was age 15, 24-year-old Kelly had sexual relations with her as an underage high school student, encouraged her to recruit her school friends, and pressured her into engaging in group sex with other underage girls. In 1998, Kelly settled the lawsuit with Hawkins for $250,000.

Illegal marriage (1994) 

In 1991, Barry Hankerson introduced his niece Aaliyah to Kelly when she was 12 years old. "I saw her as a star the minute I heard her sing and dance," Kelly said. A witness later testified that Kelly had sexual contact with Aaliyah starting when she was "13 or 14 years old." Kelly wrote and produced Aaliyah's debut album, Age Ain't Nothing but a Number, which was released in May 1994. 

On August 31, 1994, Kelly, then 27, married Aaliyah, then 15, in a secret ceremony at Sheraton Gateway Suites in Rosemont, Illinois. Reportedly, Kelly married Aaliyah after he found out she was pregnant. Their marriage certificate was published in the Dec. 1994 / Jan. 1995 issue of Vibe magazine. Their marriage was annulled in February 1995 at the behest of Aaliyah's family by a Michigan judge.  In May 1997, Aaliyah filed a lawsuit in Cook County to have the marriage record expunged, stating that she was underage at the time of marriage, had lied by signing the marriage certificate as an 18-year-old, and that she could not legally enter into marriage without parental consent.

Kelly and Aaliyah both denied that their relationship had moved beyond friendship. In 2016, Kelly told GQ magazine: "Well, because of Aaliyah's passing ... I will never have that conversation with anyone. Out of respect for Aaliyah, and her mother and father who has asked me not to personally. But I can tell you I loved her, I can tell you she loved me, we was very close. We were, you know, best best best best friends."

In 2019, federal prosecutors in the state of New York charged Kelly with bribery related to the 1994 purchase of a fake identification card for Aaliyah in order to obtain a marriage license. Kelly's former tour manager, Demetrius Smith, testified that he facilitated the wedding by obtaining falsified identification for Aaliyah, which listed her as 18 years old. Kelly, through his lawyers, admitted in 2021 to having had 'underage sexual contact' with Aaliyah.

Exposure of child sexual abuse material and indictment (2002) 
On February 3, 2002, a video began circulating allegedly depicting Kelly's sexual abuse of a girl known to be underage. The abuse included Kelly urinating on her. The video was released by an unknown source and sent to the Chicago Sun-Times. The publisher broke the story on February 8, 2002, the same day Kelly performed at the opening ceremony of the 2002 Winter Olympics. Kelly has said in interviews that he was not the man in the video. In June 2002, Kelly was indicted in Chicago on 21 counts of child pornography. That same month on June 5, 2002, Kelly was arrested by the Miami Police Department on a Chicago arrest warrant at his Florida vacation home. He was released after one night in jail, the following day after posting bail of $750,000.

While investigating the photographs reported in the Chicago Sun-Times, Polk County Sheriff's Office conducted a search of Kelly's residence in Davenport, Florida. During the search, officers recovered 12 images of an alleged underage girl on a digital camera – wrapped in a towel in a duffel bag – which allegedly depicted Kelly "involved in sexual conduct with the female minor". According to the Chicago Sun-Times, the girl in the images obtained from Kelly's Florida home also appears in the videotape; which got Kelly indicted in Chicago.

Police investigators from Polk County and Miami-Dade County arrested Kelly on January 22, 2003, at Miami's Wyndham Grand Bay Hotel for 12 counts of possession of child pornography. Kelly posted bail of $12,000 bond and was released three hours later from Miami-Dade county jail. In March 2004, these charges were dropped due to a lack of probable cause for the search warrants.

The alleged victim refused to testify at the trial, and a Chicago jury found Kelly not guilty on all 14 counts of child pornography in June 2008. Kelly's own defense lawyer, Ed Genson, questioned the acquittal and Kelly's public proclamations of innocence.

Allegations of child molestation (2009) 
In a divorce court filing unsealed in 2020, R. Kelly's former wife Andrea claims that R. Kelly was accused of molesting a preteen girl in 2009.

Second series of accusations (2010s–present)

Huffington Post Live interview (2015) 
In December 2015, Kelly appeared on Huffington Post Live in an interview with journalist Caroline Modarressy-Tehrani. The interview was conducted so that he could promote the release of his thirteenth solo album, The Buffet.

During the interview, Modarressy-Tehrani quizzed Kelly about the sexual abuse allegations being leveled against him and wanted to gauge his reaction. This resulted in Kelly growing angry and defensive. He continually shouted over Modarressy-Tehrani, asked her whether she drank and threatened to leave and go to McDonald's. Kelly stormed out of the interview before it ended.

The incident was one of the first occasions where Kelly was concretely asked about the allegations against him on a public platform. Following Kelly's New York conviction in late-September 2021, Modarressy-Tehrani tweeted: "Now, with this verdict, hopefully, his survivors get some peace and feel this justice."

Alleged sex cult (2010s) 
Jim DeRogatis reported for BuzzFeed News on July 17, 2017, that Kelly was accused by three sets of parents of holding their daughters in an "abusive cult". Kelly and the alleged victims denied the allegations.

In March 2018, BBC World Service aired a documentary entitled R Kelly: Sex, Girls and Videotapes presented by reporter Ben Zand that explored the 2017 allegations. This was followed up in May with the BBC Three documentary R Kelly: The Sex Scandal Continues, which included interviews with the Savage family.

Kelly was again accused of misconduct on April 17, 2018, by a former partner of his who claimed that Kelly "intentionally" infected her with a sexually transmitted disease. A representative for Kelly stated that he "categorically denies all claims and allegations".

In a January 2019 BBC News article, a woman named Asante McGee whom Kelly had met in 2014 and taken to live with him some months later, said that she lived with not only Kelly alone, but with other women. She said: "He controlled every aspect of my life, while I lived with him." McGee later moved out on her own accord.

Boycott and industry response 
In May 2018, the Women of Color branch of the Time's Up movement called for a boycott of Kelly's music and performances over the many allegations against him. The boycott was accompanied by a social media campaign called Mute R. Kelly. In response, his management said that Kelly supports the movement in principle, but targeting him was "the attempted lynching of a black man who has made extraordinary contributions to our culture".

Music streaming service Spotify announced on May 10, 2018, that it was going to stop promoting or recommending music by Kelly, and XXXTentacion stating, "We don't censor content because of an artist's or creator's behavior, but we want our editorial decisions—what we choose to program—to reflect our values." Two days later, Apple Music and Pandora also announced that they would cease to feature or promote Kelly's music. Spotify was criticized by members of the music industry with concerns the decision would create a "slippery slope" of muting artists accused of criminal activity. Spotify ultimately reversed this decision, following initial backlash including that of Top Dawg Entertainment, which threatened to remove its musical catalog from streaming service.

In early-January 2019, Kelly was dropped from RCA Records following the airing of Surviving R. Kelly, which detailed numerous sexual assault allegations against the singer for decades. A number of musicians who collaborated with Kelly expressed regret for working with him, including Celine Dion ("I'm Your Angel"), Nick Cannon ("Gigolo"), Chance the Rapper ("Somewhere in Paradise"), Lady Gaga ("Do What U Want"), and Jennifer Hudson ("It's Your World"). Some went the extent of having streaming services remove their own songs that feature his vocals or credit him for songwriting or production.

As of October 2021, following his New York conviction, Kelly's YouTube channel was terminated, but his catalogue remained available on YouTube Music.

Alleged music industry complicity
In May 2018, The Washington Post reporter Geoff Edgers wrote "The Star Treatment", a lengthy article alleging music industry executives' willful blindness to Kelly's sexually abusive behavior toward underage girls. Edgers reported that as early as 1994, Kelly's tour manager urged Jive Records founder Clive Calder to tell Kelly he would not release the singer's records if he continued to have "incidents" with young women after every concert he gave. Calder told the Post that he regretted not having done more at the time, saying "Clearly, we missed something."

Former Jive president Barry Weiss told the newspaper that during twenty years with the label he never concerned himself with Kelly's private life and was unaware of two lawsuits filed against Kelly and the label by young women alleging sexual misconduct while they were minors. Jive Records had, in fact, successfully argued it was not liable. Larry Khan, another Jive executive who worked closely with the singer even after viewing the sex tape, likewise implied it was not the label's responsibility, and pointed to Chuck Berry and Jerry Lee Lewis as musicians whose labels continued to release and promote their records despite public awareness that they were involved with underage girls.

According to Post, executives at Epic Records also took a similarly relaxed attitude towards allegations of Kelly's sexual misconduct. In 2002, after Kelly signed with the label, executive David McPherson allegedly avoided viewing a copy of a tape purportedly showing the singer having sex with an underage girl; he simultaneously warned Kelly's assistant that if it turned out to be Kelly on that tape, the label would drop him. McPherson did not respond to the Posts requests for comment.

An intern with the label whose work suffered after she began a relationship with Kelly, ultimately costing her the position, settled with Epic for $250,000. Cathy Carroll, the executive she worked for, regularly rebuked her former subordinate for having an affair with a married man whenever the two met at social functions for years afterwards, and the damage to the woman's reputation led her to abandon her career in the music industry. Carroll told the newspaper the woman was "starstruck ... A lot of times it's not really the men."

The Washington Post also suggested the labels were complicit in the sex-cult allegations from the previous summer's BuzzFeed piece. Employees at the studios where Kelly recorded were required to sign non-disclosure agreements and not enter certain rooms, which they said they believed were where Kelly made the young women and underage girls stay while he worked. Despite the agreements, the newspaper was able to publish screenshots of text exchanges where young women and underage girls in the rooms asked Kelly's assistants to let them out so they could go to the bathroom or get food. The newspaper also published pictures taken after Kelly had concluded a six-week session at a Los Angeles studio, paid for by his former record label, RCA Records, showing a cup of urine sitting on a piano and urine stains on the wooden floor of another room.

Surviving R. Kelly (2019–2020) 

In January 2019, Lifetime began airing a six-part documentary series titled Surviving R. Kelly detailing sexual abuse and misconduct allegations against Kelly. Writing for the Los Angeles Times, Loraine Ali observed that the series covered a range of in-depth interviews that "paint a picture of a predator whose behavior was consistently overlooked by the industry, his peers and the public while his spiritual hit was sung in churches and schools."

Within two weeks, Kelly launched a Facebook page where he sought to discredit the accusers who appeared in the docuseries. Facebook removed the page for violating their standards as it appeared to contain personal contact information for his accusers. The second season titled Surviving R. Kelly Part II: The Reckoning premiered on January 2, 2020. January 2–3, 2023 commences the dates of the final season titled Surviving R. Kelly: The Final Chapter, as confirmed on a December 14, 2022 trailer uploaded on Lifetime's YouTube account.

Following airing of the Surviving R. Kelly documentary, Kelly was listed in Guinness World Records as the most searched for male musician on Google in 2019. He ranked 8th overall on Google's list of the 10 most search for people for the year.

CBS This Morning interview with Gayle King (2019) 
On March 6, 2019, Gayle King interviewed Kelly on CBS This Morning. Kelly insisted on his innocence and blamed social media for the allegations. During the interview, Kelly had an emotional outburst where he stood up, pounded his chest, and yelled. Asked by King about John Legend and Lady Gaga denouncing him, Kelly called them "not professional".

The CBS This Morning segment also included two women whose parents claimed were brainwashed captives of Kelly. They described themselves as "girlfriends" of Kelly, defending and declaring their love for him, while also denouncing their parents. Afterward, King would debrief with colleagues on the recording on the segment. She recalled that a condition for recording the segment with the "girlfriends" was that Kelly would not be in the room with them. Kelly had nevertheless stayed nearby during the recording and, according to King, Kelly would "cough really loudly" to remind the women of his presence.

2019 Cook County arrest and indictments 
On February 22, 2019, the Cook County State's Attorney's Office in Illinois charged Kelly with 10 counts of aggravated criminal sexual abuse. The charges allege that from 1998 to 2010, Kelly sexually abused four females, three of whom were teen minors at the time, with evidence including a video provided by Michael Avenatti of an alleged new crime. After Kelly turned himself in the day the charges were announced, he was arrested by the Chicago Police Department and taken into custody.

The judge set bond at $1 million and ordered Kelly to have no contact with any minor under 18 or alleged victim. Kelly pleaded not guilty to all charges, which he called lies. He was released on bail after three nights at Cook County Jail.

Federal indictments and pretrial detention (2019–present) 
The first grand jury indictment from the Eastern District of New York was handed down June 20, 2019. On July 11, 2019, Kelly was arrested on federal charges alleging sex crimes and obstruction of justice by U.S. Homeland Security investigators and NYPD detectives in Chicago. A day later, following his re-arrest, federal prosecutors from New York and Chicago indicted Kelly on 18 charges, including child sexual exploitation, child pornography production, sex trafficking, kidnapping, forced labor, racketeering, and obstruction of justice.

Following his re-arrest on the first superseding indictment, the United States Attorney for the Eastern District of New York filed a letter in support of a permanent order of detention that previewed its case against Kelly, concluding that "preponderance of the evidence that the defendant’s release poses a both a risk of flight and a risk of obstruction of justice". Kelly's first arraignment on the Eastern District case took place before a United States Magistrate Judge Steven Tiscione on August 2, 2019, where he plead not guilty. Judge Tiscione denied bail, on grounds of both dangerousness and flight risk.

Kelly's lawyers made a request for pre-trial release October 2019 and were denied. His lawyers tried again to secure pre-trial release in 2020, citing the COVID-19 pandemic; the request was denied.

Superseding indictments were filed in Chicago on February 13, 2020, and in New York on March 13, 2020, raising the total number of charges to 22. He was incarcerated at Metropolitan Correctional Center, Chicago from July 11, 2019, to June 23, 2021, when he was transferred to Metropolitan Detention Center, Brooklyn.

On January 30, 2023, the Cook County District Attorney's office announced that several Illinois-specific charges against Kelly had been dropped, due to "him already being served justice in extensive federal sentences", preventing him to face more maximum prison time for state-related charges.

Hennepin County indictment (2019) 
On August 5, 2019, the State's Attorney Office in Hennepin County, Minnesota charged Kelly with soliciting a minor and prostitution. Prosecutors alleged that in July 2001, following a concert in Minneapolis, Kelly had invited a girl up to his hotel room and paid her $200 to remove her clothing and dance with him.

Trial in the Eastern District of New York (2021) 

The United States District Court for the Eastern District of New York was the first federal court to indict Kelly; at the time, it was the only jurisdiction to take Kelly to trial following the charges filed in the wake of Surviving R. Kelly. Investigations continued with Kelly indicted, jailed and awaiting trial. Before trial, prosecutors previewed a growing body of evidence including evidence of bribes and recordings of threats. It was a month before trial that prosecutors first accused Kelly of abusing a male victim, an underaged boy he met at McDonald's, as pattern evidence in his trial.

Jury trial 
With Judge Ann Donnelly presiding, voir dire in United States v. Robert Sylvester Kelly was held August 9, 2021. The same day, Kelly's lawyers filed a last-second motion to dismiss charges related to his transmission of genital herpes to several of his victims; that Kelly knew of his infection and non-disclosure to his sexual partners is a criminal act under the Public Health Law of New York and was presented as a predicate act for the charge of racketeering as well as the violations of the Mann Act. Judge Donnelly denied the motion, releasing a written decision after the trial.

The federal jury trial began on August 18, 2021, with opening statements by prosecution and defense lawyers. The first witness called was Jerhonda Pace, one of the subjects of Surviving R. Kelly whose identity is widely known. She was the first of any of Kelly's accusers to have ever testified against him in court. Pace testified that Kelly's abuse included slapping, choking, and raping her. On cross examination, Pace was asked about signing a statement that she had deceived Kelly about her age and replied that it was a condition of a settlement.

In all, eleven witnesses at Kelly's trial accused him of abuse either sexual or physical, with some accusing him of both. Two accusers were men alleging Kelly had sexually abused them as children; one ("Louis") had recruited the other ("Alex") and testified as a cooperating witness. In addition, eight employees of Kelly's staff testified, corroborating details of Kelly's modus operandi.

Toward the end of the testimony on September 15, 2021, video corroborating accusers' accounts of abuse was shown to the jury, but not the public nor media. The videos were alluded to in later closing arguments as depicting Kelly delivering a painful spanking to one accuser, and a lengthy recording in which Kelly demanded acts of coprophagia and urophagia to humiliate another accuser. As the jury deliberated, the press were allowed to listen to the audio portions to fulfill obligations of access to evidence; accounts confirm that Kelly and his victim's voices are heard narrating the graphic acts of abuse of the latter recording. Months after the verdict, prosecutors disclosed that, following Kelly's orders, "[a]t least three women made videos of themselves eating feces and rubbing it over their bodies."

Guilty verdicts 
After a six-week trial including two days of deliberations, on September 27, 2021, the jury returned a verdict of guilty on all nine counts of the verdict sheet. They include:

 One count of Racketeering. 
 Eight Mann Act violations:
 Three counts of transportation across state lines for illegal sexual activity
 Four counts coercion and enticement
 One count of transportation of a minor.

As described in a release by the United States Attorney for the Eastern District of New York, the racketeering charge against Kelly specified the following predicate acts:

Post-verdict reaction 
United States District Judge Ann Donnelly ordered Kelly to be kept in custody at the Metropolitan Detention Center, Brooklyn to await sentencing. Kelly faced a sentencing range of 10 years to life in prison, and on June 29, 2022, was sentenced to spend 30 years behind bars.
After the jury delivered their verdict, women's rights attorney Gloria Allred, who represented several victims, stated that Kelly was the worst sexual predator she had pursued in her 47-year career of practicing law.

Writing for The New Yorker, longtime Kelly critic Jim DeRogatis asked, "how many more victims are there who we don't know about? This case involved twenty women and two men, but there are likely many more." DeRogatis noted that before the trial, prosecutors had told the judge they would call Susan E. Loggans, a Chicago attorney who had negotiated settlements on behalf of several accusers who testified in the criminal case. Loggans was never actually called to the stand.

On October 29, 2021, Kelly retained the services of Jennifer Ann Bonjean, who has helped overturn rape convictions for Bill Cosby and a victim of Jon Burge. Kelly fired his other lawyers in January 2022.

Sentencing 

The sentencing process in the Eastern District of New York began with the presentation of the sealed Presentence Report (PSR) by the Office of Probation to the court on April 5, 2022. Kelly's defense lawyer Jennifer Bonjean lodged several objections to the report's description of Kelly's conduct.

The opposing sides differed sharply in assessments of applicable sentence. Bonjean filed a defense sentencing memorandum arguing that the applicable sentence according to United States Federal Sentencing Guidelines would be 168–210 months imprisonment, and that Kelly should receive less prison time. Arguing for leniency, Bonjean also wrote that a minor victim of Kelly was "a sophisticated 16-year-old". In its own sentencing memorandum, prosecutors supported the application of several enhancements under Sentencing Guidelines, adding up to a sentence of 25 years-to-life imprisonment, and that "[g]iven the need for specific deterrence and incapacitation, the government respectfully submits that a shorter sentence would be insufficient to adequately protect the public."

Kelly's defense submitted several exhibits of their own attesting to mitigating factors in a supplement to the sentencing memorandum. The exhibits were filed under seal. Following an unsealing and redaction process, the court revealed that factors Kelly's defense cited were his history of adverse childhood experiences, including sexual abuse by his sister and his illiteracy. Defense experts diagnosed Kelly with hypersexuality.

In the first half of Kelly's sentencing date of June 29, 2022, seven women were permitted to address court with their victim impact statements. According to Rolling Stone journalists, Kelly refused to look at them. Judge Donnelly ended the day reportedly sentencing Kelly to 30 years imprisonment, admonishing his criminality as "calculated and carefully planned and regularly executed for almost 25 years".

In her written judgment, Donnelly's sentence was apportioned as 30 years for the top charge of racketeering; 20 year sentences for three acts of Mann Act coercion and enticement; a 20-year sentence for one violation of the Mann Act transportation of a minor; and 10 years for three counts of Mann Act transportation across state lines for illegal sexual activity. These prison sentences will be served concurrently. Following Kelly's completing a prison sentence, Judge Donnelly ordered Kelly to serve 5 years of supervised release with conditions typical for sex offenders.

In addition to prison time, Judge Donnelly levied a $100,000 fine plus a statutory $40,000 penalty under the Justice for Victims of Trafficking Act of 2015. Contesting the assessments, attorney Jennifer Bonjean claimed that Kelly has lost his income and is indigent. Prosecutors countered that Kelly has secretly sold rights to his composition and lyrics royalties for $5 million. On September 28, 2022, Kelly was ordered to pay restitution of $300,000 to one of his victims, with potential for tens of thousands of dollars more to pay for another victim.

According to Bonjean, Kelly was "devastated" by his sentence but would appeal. Following his sentencing, the Federal Bureau of Prisons placed Kelly under suicide watch. His legal team argued that the measures were unnecessary, punitive and cruel, because he was never suicidal nor had he ever even thought about suicide. However, prosecutors defended the placement, claiming it was for his own safety. On Independence Day 2022, authorities removed Kelly from suicide watch.

On July 13, 2022, Kelly transferred out of Metropolitan Detention Center, Brooklyn to Metropolitan Correctional Center, Chicago in anticipation of a trial in the United States District Court for the Northern District of Illinois.

Trial in the Northern District of Illinois (2022) 
Parallel to Eastern District of New York prosecution, the United States District Court for the Northern District of Illinois in Chicago indicted Kelly alongside two alleged co-conspirators: his manager Derrel McDavid and his personal assistant Milton "June" Brown. All pled "not guilty". The case was tried before Judge Harry Leinenweber, and commenced on August 17, 2022.

Allegations 
The final superseding indictment of Kelly and his co-conspirators charged him with the following:

 Counts One through Four: Production of child pornography for four videos filmed with "Minor 1" between 1998 and 1999.
 Count Five: Conspiracy to defraud the United States for various illegal acts from 2001 until 2015 to cover up offenses in the 2002 Cook County case.
 Counts Six through Eight: Receipt of child pornography (18 USC §  and § ) conspiracies to obtain videos of child sexual abuse to conceal them.
 Counts Nine through Thirteen: Child sex trafficking through coercion and enticement of five unnamed victims (listed as Minors 1, 3, 4, 5, 6), for acts committed in the time span of 1996 through 2001.

Trial process 
Jury selection began August 15, 2022. Over 100 potential jurors were interviewed over two days. The regular jury of twelve persons consisted of four white women, four black women, two white men, and two black men.

On the first day of testimony, the jury heard from a witness who is allegedly depicted in the child sexual abuse material revealed in 2002. Now 37, the alleged victim was allowed by the court to testify under the pseudonym "Jane". She testified that Kelly groomed her for sexual abuse starting when she was 13 years of age, presenting himself as a benevolent "godfather". Jane also told the jury that Kelly induced her to recruit other girls for abuse. Speaking to efforts to thwart law enforcement, Jane told the court that Kelly sent her to travel to the Bahamas and Cancun to keep her away from law enforcement, and coaxed her to lie to a grand jury.

Also testifying was an individual who purchased a home previously owned by Kelly. The interior was alleged to match the 2002 video. The individual noted that after his purchase, he discovered a bedroom contained a camera disguised as a smoke detector and a secured door requiring a button to be pressed to leave.

Verdict and sentencing 
On September 14, the jury found Kelly guilty on three of thirteen charges of production of child pornography and three charges of enticing a child, but acquitted him and his alleged co-conspirators of trial fixing related to his 2008 state child pornography trial.

Stating a case for leniency in a sentencing memorandum, Kelly's attorneys made a number of technical arguments about the Chicago federal case, but concedes repeated sexual encounters with the testifying victims when they were underage. Arguing for mitigation, the memorandum includes a passage written by expert witness Dr. Renee Sorentino arguing that Kelly is not a pedophile:I considered the diagnosis of Pedophilia given Mr. Kelly’s alleged history of sexual contact with minors. The diagnosis of Pedophilia is used to refer to individuals who experience recurrent, intense, sexually arousing fantasies or sexual urges involving sexual activity with prepubescent child or children (generally age 13 years of younger). I rejected the diagnosis because Mr. Kelly does not report a history of sexual arousal to prepubescent individual and his sexual behavior has never involved prepubescent individuals. Dr. Sorentino is co-author of a paper arguing for a distinction beween pedophilia and ephebophilia, and using the term "minor-attracted person." The paper also cites research by the organization Virtuous Pedophiles. Use of the term in a criminal justice context is controversial.

In their own sentencing memorandum, prosecutors requested a 300-month prison sentence, to be served consecutively to the sentence from the Eastern District of New York (in effect life imprisonment). Arguing that Kelly's criminal conduct in Illinois is separate from the conduct of his previous conviction in New York and severe, the memorandum states in its opening paragraph:Robert Kelly is a serial sexual predator who, over the course of many years, specifically targeted young girls and went to great lengths to conceal his abuse of Jane and other minor victims. To this day, and even following the jury verdict against him, Kelly refuses to accept responsibility for his crimes. To the contrary, Kelly brazenly blames his victims and argues that his abuse of 14, 15, and 16 year-old girls was justified because some of his victims as minors “wanted to pursue a romantic and sexual connection” with him and others remained in contact with him as adults. At the age of 56 years old, Kelly’s lack of remorse and failure to grasp the gravity of his criminal conduct against children demonstrates that he poses a serious danger to society. Kelly goes so far as to insinuate that he—and not the young girls he abused— is the victim, because the federal government elected to prosecute him for egregious conduct that occurred throughout the United States for over 20 years. Kelly was sentenced in Chicago federal court on February 23, 2023. Judge Harry Leinenweber sentenced Kelly to 20 years: 19 concurrent to the 30 year sentence from New York and 1 year consecutively, effectively bringing his sentence to 31 years.

Other court cases 
Other than the federal sex abuse cases, Kelly has been involved in several high-profile criminal cases and lawsuits.

Criminal 
 August 13, 1997: Kelly was found guilty of battery and placed on unsupervised probation for one year in Lafayette, Louisiana as a result of a July 1996 brawl which involved the singer and his entourage. One of the victims needed a total of 110 facial stitches.
 April 8, 1998: Kelly was arrested in Chicago on three misdemeanor charges of disorderly conduct, including one charge of violating noise ordinance for playing his music extremely loud from his car, during a test run. He was allegedly confrontational as he was arrested and placed into custody. The vehicle he was testing audio in was impounded and placed on a $500 daily recovery fee. Prosecutors from the district attorney's office dropped the first two charges on May 7, and the noise charge on July 22 that year.
 March 6, 2019: Kelly was taken to the Cook County Jail after failing to pay child support in the amount of $161,633 to his former wife, Andrea. Three days later, he was released after someone, whose identity was withheld, paid off the child support on his behalf. His lawyer says he could not discuss the payment due to a gag order.

Civil suits 
 November 1, 2004: Kelly launched a $75 million lawsuit against former friend Jay-Z and several concert organizers and/or promoters for removing him from the Best of Both Worlds tour. The lawsuit for breach of contract, which sought $75 million in damages ($60 million in punitive damages and $15 million for lost income) was a result of not being able to tour. 
 January 2005: Jay-Z countersued the singer, claiming Kelly showed erratic behavior including being late or absent attendances, vacating deadlines, and continued demands or requests that led to several cancellations and resulted in loss of gross. Kelly's lawyers challenged it as "inaccurate smears of [Mr. Kelly] that are utterly irrelevant to the issues of the case" but confirmed the rapper's refusal to continue work with Kelly after the Madison Square Garden incident and thus broke the contract. Jay-Z's counter suit was dismissed by a judge that May.
 November 2005: Kelly sued Jay-Z again, claiming that now Roc Nation executive Tyran "Ty Ty" Smith was awarded with the position of vice president at the artist and repertoire department of Def Jam Recordings (which Jay was president of at the time), as a result of the latter pepper-spraying Kelly on October 29, 2004.

Personal life
Kelly's mother, Joanne, died from cancer in 1993. He has given conflicting accounts of where he was during his mother's passing. His oldest daughter, JoAnn (born in 1998), was named after the singer's mother, but is also known as Buku Abi.

In 1996, Kelly married Andrea Kelly (née Lee), his former backup dancer and mother of his three children, the aforementioned JoAnn, as well as Jaah (b. 2000), and Robert, Jr. (b. 2002) Andrea filed a restraining order against Kelly in September 2005 after a physical altercation, ultimately filing for divorce in 2006. In January 2009, their divorce was finalized after 13 years of marriage. In later years, Andrea accused Kelly of physical, verbal, and mental abuse, including in Surviving R. Kelly (2019).

Philanthropy

 In April 2007, Kelly released the song "Rise Up" for Virginia Tech after the 2007 school shooting and donated the net proceeds to the families of the victims.
 In 2010, Kelly penned the song "Sign of a Victory" for the FIFA World Cup, with all proceeds benefiting African charities.
 On April 6, 2011, he performed at a charity event in Chicago benefiting Clara's House, a facility designed to build employment, housing, health care, and education in the projects of Chicago.
 In 2016, Kelly donated cases of water to the Flint water crisis.

Books
Soulacoaster: The Diary of Me (2012, autobiography)

See also
Honorific nicknames in popular music
List of artists who reached number one in the United States
List of Billboard number-one singles
List of highest-certified music artists in the United States
List of songs recorded by R. Kelly
List of songs written and produced by R. Kelly
List of unreleased songs recorded by R. Kelly
Shaggy defense

References

External links

R. Kelly: Sex, Girls and Videotapes, BBC documentary, March 28, 2018

 
1967 births
Living people
20th-century African-American male singers
20th-century American criminals
21st-century African-American male singers
21st-century American criminals
African-American basketball players
African-American Christians
African-American male actors
African-American male singer-songwriters
African-American record producers
American contemporary R&B singers
American gospel singers
American hip hop record producers
American hip hop singers
American male criminals
American male film actors
American men's basketball players
American music arrangers
American music industry executives
American music video directors
American people convicted of child pornography offenses
American people convicted of child sexual abuse
American people convicted of kidnapping
American prisoners and detainees
American soul singers
American sportspeople convicted of crimes
American tenors
Articles containing video clips
Atlantic City Seagulls players
Basketball players from Chicago
Child abuse incidents and cases
Child marriage in the United States
Child sexual abuse in the United States
Criminals from Chicago
Cult leaders
Grammy Award winners
Guards (basketball)
Jive Records artists
Male actors from Chicago
Music controversies
Music video codirectors
People acquitted of sex crimes
People convicted of racketeering
People convicted of sex trafficking
People convicted of violating the Mann Act
People from Olympia Fields, Illinois
People stripped of awards
Prisoners and detainees of Illinois
RCA Records artists
Record producers from Illinois
Shooting guards
Singers from Chicago
Singer-songwriters from Illinois
Small forwards
Sportspeople from Cook County, Illinois
Violence against women in the United States